The Electoral district of Portland (also known as Town of Portland) was an electorate of the Victorian Legislative Council (Australia).

From 1851 to 1856, this was a district of the unicameral Victorian Legislative Council; initially with one member and two from the enlarged council of 1853. It centred on the town of Portland, Victoria.

In 1856 the Electoral district of Portland (an electorate of the Victorian Legislative Assembly) was created.

Members
Two members from 1853.

References

Former electoral districts of Victorian Legislative Council
1851 establishments in Australia
1856 disestablishments in Australia